Tory Burch (née Robinson; born June 17, 1966) is an American fashion designer, businesswoman, and philanthropist. She is the Executive Chairman and Chief Creative Officer of her own brand, Tory Burch LLC. She was listed as the 88th most powerful woman in the world by Forbes in 2020.

Early life and education
Burch was born in Valley Forge, Pennsylvania, the daughter of Reva (née Schapira) and Ira Earl "Bud" Robinson (1923–2007). She was raised with her three brothers in a 250-year-old Georgian farmhouse near Valley Forge National Historical Park.

Her father was a wealthy investor who inherited a stock exchange seat and a paper cup company. Burch is Jewish on her mother's side.

Burch attended the Agnes Irwin School in Rosemont, Pennsylvania, where she was a friend of jewelry designer Kara Ross. Her first job was at Benetton in the King of Prussia mall. She then attended the University of Pennsylvania, where she majored in art history, and graduated in 1988. Burch is a member of the Kappa Alpha Theta sorority.

Career

Early work
After graduating from college, Tory moved to New York City, where she worked for Zoran, a Yugoslavian designer, followed by Harper's Bazaar magazine. She then moved into public relations and advertising positions at Vera Wang,  Polo Ralph Lauren, and Loewe when Narciso Rodriguez was there.

Fashion label

Burch began her fashion label – "TRB by Tory Burch", later known as Tory Burch – in February 2004, launching it with a retail store in Manhattan's Nolita district.

As of 2020, it has grown to include more than 350 stores worldwide; the fashion line is also carried at over 3,000 department and specialty stores worldwide.newspaper
In 2015 Burch also introduced a separate performance activewear line, Tory Sport.

Awards and recognition
In 2005, Burch won the Rising Star Award for Best New Retail Concept from the Fashion Group International. In 2007, she won the Accessory Brand Launch of the year award at the Accessories Council Excellence Awards. In 2008, Burch won the Council of Fashion Designers of America award for Accessories Designer of the Year.  Working Mother included her on their list of the 50 Most Powerful Moms of 2015. In 2015, she received the Breast Cancer Research Foundation's Sandra Taub Humanitarian Award.

Burch has consistently been included on Forbes list of The World's 100 Most Powerful Women. , she is listed as the 88th most powerful woman in the world by Forbes. In November 2019, Burch was named a Glamour Woman of the Year. In November 2020, she was featured in a cover story in Forbes magazine on how her fashion company navigated the COVID-19 pandemic. In
2021, she was named an inaugural member of the advisory council for the Smithsonian American Women's History Museum in Washington, DC. In 2022, the Wharton School's Jay H. Baker Retailing Center and Retail Leaders Circle honored her with its inaugural Retail Excellence Award in recognition of her industry leadership and support of women entrepreneurs. In 2022 she also received the Parsons Table Award from the Parsons School of Design; the award "recognizes individuals who have made a noteworthy impact on the design industry and have inspired our students".

Philanthropy

Burch serves on the boards of the Council of Fashion Designers of America, the Society of Memorial Sloan-Kettering Cancer Center, the Breast Cancer Research Foundation, the Startup America Partnership, and the Barnes Foundation. She is a member of the Industry Advisory Board of the Jay H. Baker Retailing Center at the Wharton School of Business, and a member of the Council on Foreign Relations. She chaired the 2007 spring gala for the American Ballet Theatre.

In 2009, Burch founded the Tory Burch Foundation, which supports the economic empowerment of women in the U.S. through small business loans, mentoring, and entrepreneurial education. Burch's stores sell products whose proceeds support the foundation's work.

Among its initiatives, the Tory Burch Foundation offers an entrepreneurial education program, in collaboration with Goldman Sachs 10,000 Small Businesses and Babson College. The foundation also offers a fellows program providing women entrepreneurs with business-education grants, mentoring, and networking opportunities.

In 2014, the foundation launched Elizabeth Street Capital, an initiative with Bank of America, to provide women entrepreneurs with access to low-cost loans and mentoring support. The initiative, originally named for the location of the first Tory Burch boutique, is now known as the Tory Burch Foundation Capital Program. By November 2017, Bank of America had committed a total of $50 million to the program, and by 2018 the program was facilitating $1 million in loans each month. By September 2021, the program had distributed over $65 million in loans to more than 3,500 women entrepreneurs.

In April 2014, the Obama Administration named Burch an inaugural member of the Presidential Ambassadors for Global Entrepreneurship, a group of successful American businesspeople committed to developing the next generation of entrepreneurs in the U.S. and around the world.

In March 2017, to coincide with International Women's Day and Women's History Month, the Tory Burch Foundation launched Embrace Ambition, a global campaign to address the double standard that exists around ambition, which is often seen as a positive trait in men and a negative one in women. The campaign includes a video PSA featuring a variety of celebrities, both women and men. In September 2017, Burch wrote an opinion piece in Time on pay equity for women, noting how equal pay benefits society and business across the board. In April 2018 Burch and her foundation hosted the first Embrace Ambition Summit, an all-day event supporting women's ambition and examining stereotypes about women and ambition in the workplace, at Lincoln Center in New York and also viewable on the Tory Burch Foundation website. In March 2019, the Embrace Ambition initiative hosted a sequential five-day speaker series in five cities: Philadelphia, Chicago, Dallas, San Francisco, and New York. The foundation hosted the second Embrace Ambition Summit in March 2020 in New York.

In June 2020, Newsweek recognized Tory Burch as one of “50 US Companies That Stood Out During the Pandemic”, for providing $5 million of clothing, and 3,000 yards of fabric for face masks and hospital gowns, to frontline healthcare workers.

In 2021, the Tory Burch company and the School of Fashion at Parsons School of Design announced a five-year multi-disciplinary educational partnership, and Burch announced the creation of an endowed scholarship fund at Parsons with a gift that will be matched to establish a $1,000,000 financial-aid fund.

Controversy

In 2017, a Facebook Community called La Blouse Roumaine, which promoted Romanian traditional craftsmanship, pointed that a coat by Burch, displayed at the Metropolitan Museum of Art in New York and initially marketed as a garment inspired by Africa, was virtually identical to a traditional Romanian outfit. They also pointed out that other pieces from the same collection had many similarities with Romanian garments, including the sweaters worn by the Romania national rugby union team at the 2015 Rugby World Cup. Burch acknowledged the similarity and responded: "In our effort to summarize the collection, we missed a reference to a beautiful Romanian coat which inspired one of the pieces. Whether it’s Romania, Uganda or France, we are a brand that strives to celebrate, honor and be inclusive of women from all countries and cultures, in the broadest way possible".

In March 2021, controversy rose over a jumper designed by Burch which closely resembled a traditional fishermen garment made in Póvoa de Varzim, Portugal. The stylist had initially marketed it as a 'Baja-inspired tunic', in reference to Baja California, a state in Mexico. Pictures of the piece led to criticism from Portuguese internet users and the mayor of Póvoa de Varzim. Burch issued an apology in her social media and changed the description of the piece to "Póvoa de Varzim-inspired sweater". Shortly afterwards, the Portuguese government announced its intention to take legal action and demand compensation for the heritage of Póvoa de Varzim, after which Burch removed the sweater from her website. In November 2021, the municipality of Póvoa de Varzim announced that a settlement with Burch had been reached out of court. 

Pottery pieces created by Burch were also criticised as being virtually identical to Bordallo Pinheiro ceramics designs, which led to a protest from Bordallo Pinheiro owners Vista Alegre.

Internet users also noted that Burch's logo is similar to that of a Portuguese stylist, Nuno Gama, and the Order of Christ Cross, a historical Portuguese insignia.

Personal life
In 1993 she married William Macklowe, son of real-estate tycoon Harry B. Macklowe, and was divorced within a year. In 1996 she married J. Christopher Burch, an investor in Internet Capital Group, a venture capital firm founded by Walter Buckley and Ken Fox. They have three sons: Henry, Nicholas "Nick", and Sawyer. She also has three stepdaughters from his previous marriage. They divorced in 2006. She continues to use his last name, and for some time continued to live with her children in their New York City apartment.

She dated Lance Armstrong in 2007. Afterward she was for some time linked to Lyor Cohen. In November 2018, Burch married Pierre-Yves Roussel, the former chairman and CEO of  LVMH. He became CEO of Burch's company in early 2019 and Burch became Executive Chairman and Chief Creative Officer. The couple had been dating since 2014 and became engaged in 2016.

Forbes magazine estimated that she was a billionaire with a net worth of $1.0 billion in 2013. She is worth approximately $850 million as of 2019.

References

External links

Tory Burch Foundation website

1966 births
Living people

21st-century American Jews
21st-century American women
Agnes Irwin School alumni
American company founders
American fashion businesspeople
American fashion designers
American socialites
American women chief executives
American women company founders
American women fashion designers
Former billionaires
Jewish American philanthropists
Jewish fashion designers
People from Chester County, Pennsylvania
University of Pennsylvania alumni